Radio Lollipop is a charitable organization providing a care, comfort, play and entertainment service for children in hospital. It organizes Volunteer Playmakers to spend time with children in wards or in special play areas, taking its name from the radio stations it runs in hospitals playing children's programming - part-presented by children themselves.

History
Radio Lollipop was founded in 1978 at Queen Mary's Hospital for Children in Surrey, England, at first primarily as a cable-wired radio station for the 460 children in the hospital. The station made its first broadcast on 5 May 1979, when the very first Radio Lollipop went on-air.

Following the success of the first station, the International Year of the Child Committee provided funding in 1980 to develop Radio Lollipops in other British hospitals.

Over time, emphasis shifted from the radio station to volunteers spending time on wards entertaining children in person, by playing games, doing arts and crafts, and reading stories. However, the "radio", with children's programming and often presenting on-air, remains a central part of the charity. Programming consists of on-air presenter-banter with children, interspersed with request songs, comedy and competitions. In most hospitals, the programme is wired to speakers in wards, rather than actually broadcast, but a central studio, with on-air presenters, provides a focal point and base, and is open to children. There is a project under-way to carry feed from other hospitals in different time zones throughout the day, via the internet. Radio Lollipop is run entirely by unpaid volunteers, usually a mix of city business people, retirees and medical students, and usually operates in the evenings.

In 1985, the first Radio Lollipop outside the UK was started at the Princess Margaret Hospital for Children in Perth, Western Australia. It was brought to Perth, Western Australia from Steve and Pat Salter. A couple from the United Kingdom that wanted to bring joy to Perth Children. From that beginning, the organisation has expanded to hospitals in the east coast of Australia, New Zealand, and America.

Radio Lollipop is in one of the largest and most famous specialist children referral hospitals in the world, Great Ormond Street Hospital for Children, where it provides play services to children in 390 beds on 21 wards. It originally broadcast radio from, and held play sessions in, a former Jubilee line tube train that was craned into the hospital and converted to house the Radio Lollipop studio.

Locations

Australia
Perth Children's Hospital, Perth
St John of God Hospital, Fremantle
Fiona Stanley Hospital, Murdoch
St John of God Midland Hospital, Midland
Joondalup Health Campus, Joondalup
Kelmscott Memorial Hospital, Fremantle
Rockingham, Kalgoorlie
Kalgoorlie Regional Hospital, Kalgoorlie, Western Australia
Mater Children's Hospital, Brisbane
Queensland Children's Hospital, Brisbane
Logan Hospital, Meadowbrook
Gold Coast University Hospital, Southport, 
Monash Children's Hospital, Melbourne

New Zealand

Starship Children's Hospital, Auckland
Kidz First, Middlemore Hospital, Auckland
Waitakere Hospital, Auckland
Manukau Superclinic, Auckland
Christchurch Hospital, Christchurch
Whangarei Base Hospital, Whangarei

United Kingdom
Royal Hospital for Sick Children, Edinburgh
Royal Hospital for Children, Glasgow
Birmingham Children's Hospital, Birmingham
Royal Victoria Infirmary, Newcastle-upon-Tyne
Bristol Royal Hospital for Children, Bristol
Southampton University Hospitals NHS Trust, Southampton
Manchester Children's Hospital NHS Trust, Manchester
Ninewell's Hospital and Medical School, Dundee
Great Ormond Street Hospital, London
Evelina Children's Hospital, London

United States
Nicklaus Children's Hospital, Miami
Texas Children's Hospital, Houston

South Africa
New Nelson Mandela Children's Hospital, Johannesburg

References

External links
Radio Lollipop website

Non-profit organisations based in the United Kingdom
Hospital radio stations
Radio stations in Surrey
Children's radio stations in the United Kingdom
Radio stations in Australia
Radio stations in New Zealand
Children's radio stations in the United States